The Battle of La Rothière was fought on the 1st of February 1814 between the French Empire and allied army of Austria, Prussia, Russia, and German States previously allied with France.  The French were led by Emperor Napoleon and the coalition army was under the command of Gebhard Leberecht von Blücher. The battle took place in severe weather conditions (wet snowstorm). The French were defeated but managed to hold until they could retreat under cover of darkness.

Prelude

On 25 January 1814, Blücher entered Nancy, and, moving rapidly up the valley of the Moselle, was in communication with the Austrian advanced guard near La Rothière on the afternoon of 28 January.

On 29 January Napoleon attacked the Prussians. Blücher's headquarters were surprised and he himself nearly captured by a sudden rush of French troops (Battle of Brienne). Learning at the same time that the French Emperor in person was at hand, Blücher accordingly fell back a few miles next morning to a strong position covering the exits from the Bar-sur-Aube defile.

The Austrian advance guard joined the Prussians and together they decided to accept battle—indeed they had no alternative, as the roads in rear were so choked with traffic that retreat was out of the question.

Order of battle
The French army counted about 45,000 men in 57 battalions and 62 squadrons, supported by 128 artillery pieces. The Imperial Guard was commanded by General of Division Philibert Jean-Baptiste Curial. Marshal Claude Victor-Perrin led the II Corps with three infantry divisions under Generals of Division François Antoine Teste, Jean Corbineau, and Georges Mouton. General of Division Emmanuel Grouchy led the cavalry.

On the Coalition side, Prince Scherbatov led the Russian 6th Corps, General-Leutnant Zakhar Dmitrievich Olsufiev directed the Russian 9th Corps, Count Liewen III commanded the Russian 11th Corps, Feldzeugmeister Ignaz Gyulai led the Austrian 3rd Corps, Crown Prince Frederick William of Württemberg directed the 4th Corps, General der Kavallerie Karl Philipp von Wrede commanded the Austro-Bavarian 5th Corps, and there were several independent cavalry divisions.

The multinational coalition forces used white shoulder bands to distinguish friends from foes during the battle.

Battle
About noon on 2 February Napoleon attacked, but the weather was terrible, and the ground so heavy that his favourite artillery, the mainstay of his whole system of warfare, was useless and in the drifts of snow which at intervals swept across the field, the columns lost their direction and many were severely handled by the Cossacks. At nightfall the fighting ceased and the French retired to Lesmont, leaving Marmont behind to observe Coalition movements.

Historian Digby Smith stated that French losses numbered 4,600 killed and wounded. The Coalition captured an additional 1,000 soldiers and 73 guns. The large loss of artillery was due in part to the Coalition's cavalry superiority, and in part to the soggy condition of the ground which made it difficult to withdraw the pieces in time. The Coalition had between 6,000 and 7,000 casualties.

Aftermath

At the Battle of Lesmont a French force managed to destroy the town's bridge and the Coalition force lost contact while the French moved to Troyes. Owing to the state of the roads or to the lethargy within Schwarzenberg's headquarters, no pursuit was attempted, resulting in the subsequent Battle of Champaubert.

Analysis

Notes

References
 

Attribution:

Further reading

External links
Battle of La Rothiere 1814: map, diagrams, order of battle

Battles of the War of the Sixth Coalition
Battles of the Napoleonic Wars
Battles involving Bavaria
Battles involving France
Battles involving Prussia
Battles involving Russia
Battles in Grand Est
Conflicts in 1814
February 1814 events
1814 in France
Battle of La Rothiere